On May 4, 2019, the city of San Antonio, Texas held an election to choose the next mayor of San Antonio. The election was a nonpartisan blanket primary. As no candidate secured a majority of the vote (50% of all votes cast +1), a runoff was held on June 8, 2019 between the two top candidates, incumbent mayor Ron Nirenberg and San Antonio City Councilman Greg Brockhouse. In the runoff, Nirenberg narrowly defeated Brockhouse, 51.11% to 48.89%.

Background
In the 2017 San Antonio mayoral election, Nirenberg became the first person in twenty years to defeat an incumbent mayor when he defeated Ivy Taylor in a highly contested runoff election. During his tenure in office, Nirenberg's progressive platform was often criticized and challenged by Greg Brockhouse, a more conservative member of the San Antonio City Council who also took office in 2017. Brockhouse repeatedly stated that he would challenge for the mayor's office when the 2019 elections were held. Nirenberg officially declared his candidacy for re-election on January 29, 2019 and Brockhouse officially declared his candidacy on February 9, 2019.

Candidates
A total of nine candidates submitted applications to be on the ballot for mayor. Nirenberg and Brockhouse were identified as the primary two candidates in the election.

Declared
(as listed in order on the official ballot)
 John Velasquez, a previous mayoral candidate
 Ron Nirenberg, incumbent Mayor of San Antonio
 Matt Pina, 2018 Libertarian Party nominee for Texas Land Commissioner
 Michael "Commander" Idrogo, a previous mayoral candidate
 Greg Brockhouse, member of the San Antonio City Council, District 6
 Tim Atwood
 Carlos Castanuela
 Bert Cecconi, retired Air Force colonel and perennial San Antonio City Council candidate
 Antonio "Tony" Diaz, a previous mayoral candidate

Endorsements
italicized individuals and organizations are post-regular election endorsements

Results

First round 
On May 4, 2019, the election for Mayor was held. None of the leading candidates received more than 50% of the vote and as a result, a runoff election is scheduled for Saturday, June 8, 2019 between the top two vote-getters.

 
 
 
 
 
 
 
 
 
  
 
* Vote percentage includes all of Bexar County with a total of 8,496 either voting in another municipal election or casting no ballot for San Antonio mayor.

Runoff
On June 8, 2019, a runoff election was held between Nirenberg and Brockhouse. Nirenberg narrowly won the runoff with 51.11 percent of the votes, a margin of 2,690 votes.

References

2019 Texas elections
2019 United States mayoral elections
2019
Non-partisan elections